Marlène Belley (born 1963) is a Canadian poet.

She was born in Saint-Hyacinthe, Quebec and went on to teach French in Ottawa. Her first collection of poetry Les jours sont trop longs pour se mentir, published in 1995, received the Prix Émile-Nelligan in the same year.

References 

1963 births
Living people
Canadian poets in French
Canadian women poets
People from Saint-Hyacinthe
Writers from Quebec
20th-century Canadian poets
20th-century Canadian women writers
21st-century Canadian poets
21st-century Canadian women writers